Quinazolinone is a heterocyclic chemical compound, a quinazoline with a carbonyl group in the C4N2 ring. Two isomers are possible: 2-quinazolinone and 4-quinazolinone, with the 4-isomer being the more common. These compounds are of interest in medicinal chemistry.

Synthesis
Common routes to quinazolines involve condensation of amides to anilines with ortho nitrile, carboxylic acids and amides.

Quinazolinone drugs that function as hypnotic/sedatives, methaqualone (Quaalude) for example, usually contain a 4-quinazolinone core with a 2-substituted phenyl group at nitrogen atom 3.

See also
 Idelalisib (Zydelig)
 Methaqualone (Quaalude)
 Cloroqualone
 SL-164 (Dicloqualone)
 Diproqualone
 Etaqualone
 Mebroqualone
 Mecloqualone
 Methylmethaqualone
 Nitromethaqualone

References